Habaiyeh (also Romanized as Ḩabā'īyeh; also known as Ḩabā'īyeh-ye Sādāt) is a village in Seyyed Abbas Rural District, Shavur District, Shush County, Khuzestan Province, Iran. At the 2006 census, its population was 991, in 133 families.

References 

Populated places in Shush County